Ghar (also Romanized as Ghār) is a village in Fazl Rural District, in the Central District of Nishapur County, Razavi Khorasan Province, Iran. At the 2006 census, its population was 87, in 26 families.

References 

Populated places in Nishapur County